Lesley Charles (born 15 July 1952) is a former tennis player from the UK. In 1973 and 1975 she competed in the Australian Open.
Charles was a Wimbledon mixed doubles runner-up in 1974, with compatriot Mark Farrell, losing in straight sets to Owen Davidson and Billie Jean King.

In 1974, Charles won 15 doubles titles with Sue Mappin, mainly on the British circuit.

Grand Slam finals

Mixed doubles (1 runner-up)

References 

1952 births
Living people
Sportspeople from Worcester, England
English female tennis players
British female tennis players
Tennis people from Worcestershire